Clydach may refer to any of various settlements and rivers in South Wales:
 Clydach, Monmouthshire (village)
 Clydach, Swansea (village)
Clydach (electoral ward), an electoral ward in the City and County of Swansea
 Clydach Gorge, (Welsh Cwm Clydach) Monmouthshire
 River Clydach, Monmouthshire, (Welsh Afon Clydach)
 Lower Clydach River, Swansea Valley
 Upper Clydach River, Swansea Valley
 River Clydach (Neath), tributary of River Neath at Neath
 Clydach Vale, (Rhondda Cynon Taff)

See also
 Cwm Clydach (disambiguation)